Carl Nielsen was a Danish composer.

Carl Nielsen may also refer to:
 Carl O. Nielsen (1868–1950), Norwegian businessperson
 Carl Nielsen (rower) (1930–1991), Danish rower
 Carl Nielsen Academy of Music
 Carl Nielsen Edition, the composer's works in a bilingual practical-scientific version on a music philological basis
 Carl Nielsen International Music Competition, a competition for classical musicians held in Odense, Denmark
 Carl Nielsen Museum, a museum dedicated to the life of the composer

See also
 List of compositions by Carl Nielsen
 Carl Nilsson (disambiguation)

Nielsen, Carl